La Tormenta is the second solo and Spanish-language extended play (EP) by American singer Christina Aguilera. It was released through Sony Music Latin on May 30, 2022 as the second part of her ninth studio and second Spanish-language album Aguilera (2022), following up La Fuerza. Aguilera decided to release the album in an unconventional way, one part at a time. While La Fuerza focused on strength and female empowerment, the content on La Tormenta is centered around vulnerability and heartbreak. Argentine singer Tini provides guest vocals on the EP's lead single "Suéltame".

La Tormenta was released as an EP on May 30, 2022, featuring five original songs. The version of La Tormenta featured on Aguilera features an additional version of "Cuando Me Dé la Gana" with Mexican singer Christian Nodal as the closing track. La Tormenta was followed by the third and final EP of Aguilera, titled La Luz.

Background and recording 
While recording her second Spanish album in Miami, Aguilera thought about a way to combat the fact that she takes "a long time between records", wanting to find a new way to release music. She developed the concept of a three part album, with each part reflecting a different theme: strength, vulnerability and healing. The first part of the album, La Fuerza which was about strength and womanhood, was released on January 21, 2022. The full Spanish album, Aguilera was released on May 31, 2022, and features all of the songs from the EP La Tormenta as well as its predecessor La Fuerza, and a new version of "Cuando Me Dé la Gana" featuring Christian Nodal.

Release
The release of the EP was postponed for a few days due to the Uvalde school shooting. La Tormenta premiered on May 30, 2022, and was released commercially for digital download and on streaming platforms worldwide by Sony Music Latin.

Music and singles

"Suéltame" with Tini was released as the first single from the EP and as the fourth single from Aguilera on May 30, 2022. It was released simultaneously with its parent EP and one day before Aguilera. A music video has been teased by Aguilera.

Accolades
A ranchera from the EP, "Cuando Me Dé la Gana", was nominated for Best Regional Song at the 23rd Annual Latin Grammy Awards, and has been called a "masterpiece" by Billboard magazine's Sigal Ratner-Arias.

Track listing

Notes
All songs co-produced by Afo Verde
All songs vocally produced by Jean Rodríguez

Personnel

Musicians
Christina Aguilera - lead vocals
Rafa Arcuate - producer, keyboards, programmer
Édgar Barrera - producer (5), keyboards (5), programmer (5)
Luis Barrera Jr. - producer (5), keyboards (5), programmer (5)
Jorge Luis Chacín - background vocals (4, 6)
Andy Clay - producer (3), keyboards (3), programmer (3)
Kat Dahlia - background vocals (4, 6)
Feid - producer (2), keyboards (2), programmer (2)
Yoel Henríquez - background vocals (4, 6)
Honeyboos (Daniel Rondón and Rafael Rodríguez) - producer (3)
Juan Diego Linares - producer (5)
Yasmil Marufo - background vocals (4, 6), producer (4, 6), bass (4, 6), keyboards (4, 6), programmer (4, 6)
Christian Nodal - featured vocals (6)
Mauricio Rengifo - producer (1), keyboards (1), programmer(1)
Rafael Rodríguez - keyboards (3), programmer (3)
Slow - producer (2), keyboards (2), programmer (2)
Tini - co-lead vocals (1)
Andrés Torres - producer (1), keyboards (1), programmer (1)
Afo Verde - co-producer
Federico Vindver - producer, keyboards, programmer

Technicians
Rafa Arcuate - recording engineer 
Édgar Barrera - recording engineer (5)
Luis Barrera Jr. - recording engineer (5)
Ray Charles Brown, Jr. - recording engineer (1-4)
Andy Clay - recording engineer (3)
Morgan David - assistant engineer 
Jaycen Joshua - mixing engineer, mastering engineer
Juan Diego Linares - recording engineer (5)
Yasmil Marufo - recording engineer (4)
Jean Rodríguez - recording engineer, vocal producer 
Mauricio Rengifo - recording engineer (1)
Rafael Rodríguez - recording engineer (3)
Slow - recording engineer (2)
Andrés Torres - recording engineer (1)
Felipe Trujillo - assistant engineer
Federico Vindver - recording engineer (1-4)

Release history

References

Christina Aguilera EPs
Sony Music Latin EPs
Spanish-language EPs
Latin music EPs
2022 EPs
Sequel albums
Albums produced by Andrés Torres (producer)
Albums produced by Federico Vindver
Albums produced by Mauricio Rengifo
Albums produced by Rafa Arcaute
Albums produced by Slow (DJ)
Albums produced by Feid
Albums produced by Yasmil Marrufo
Albums produced by Andy Clay
Albums produced by HoneyBoos
Albums produced by Edgar Barrera